Sphyraena argentea (also known as Pacific barracuda, California barracuda and silver barracuda) is a predatory fish found in the northeast Pacific Ocean. They range from Cabo San Lucas, Baja California to Washington. However, they are not common north of Point Conception in Santa Barbara County, California. California barracuda are very popular sport fish in Southern California.

S. argentea is a thin barracuda of the family Sphyraenidae of the order Perciformes (perch-likes).

Body type and physical description
The Pacific barracuda has an elongated cylinder shape body. They are slender and have a long pointy snout. They are of brownish-bluish color on their front sides. They are distinct from other Barracudas due to their silvery shiny backsides, small scales, and the lack of bars or spots on their body. Known for their large mouths full of sharp teeth and fang-like structures, the Pacific Barracuda are predatory fish with aggressive characteristics.  Their protruding outer jaw aid the Barracuda in its carnivorous feeding habits. The average weight of the Pacific Barracuda is about 1–3 kg. Their length is about 1-1.1 m, rarely exceeding 1.2 m. Pacific Barracuda have a distinct feature of a forked tailed fin and widely separated dorsal fins.

Habitat
The Pacific barracuda is found in the Northeast Pacific Ocean. It is usually considered a pelagic species. Although they could be found as north as Alaska, they are predominant along the coast of California down to Panama. During the winter, the Barracuda migrate south from the California coast to the Mexican coast but do not usually move past that distance.   Their most prevalent habitat is the Baja Coast of California. The Pacific Barracuda's natural habitat is in open ocean waters. The species is usually near the shores or coastal areas in adult life, however, when young, Pacific barracuda are found in bays in shallow waters. However, some Pacific Barracuda have been recorded to be found in deep waters, about 37 m. The Barracuda are known to form schools and move across the ocean in these schools of fish.  However, in some larger species, it has been noted that they can be found swimming solitarily.

Feeding and behavior
The Pacific barracuda are a predatory fish, exhibiting aggressive behavior in order to feed on other small fishes. Their diet primarily consists of small fish such as anchovies, small pacific mackerels, grunions, squid, groupers, grunts, and even young barracuda.  Their tight schools allow them to herd their prey in shallow waters circled by Barracuda, thus feeding a greater amount of fish.  The Barracuda uses its sharp eyesight to find prey, following light or sudden movements in the water that may direct the fish to prey. Their jaw and teeth structure allow them to be fierce predators to their prey. Their jaws also allow them to pump water across their gills.  Although considered aggressive predators to smaller fish, the Pacific Barracuda are typically harmless to the rest of the surrounding ocean, unlike the Great Barracuda. Their behavior only appears to be violent, however, the Pacific Barracuda will swim away when approached and return to their schools.

Maturity and reproduction
Most Pacific barracuda are mature by 2 years old. Females at that age may produce approximately 50,000 eggs while older female Pacific Barracuda can produce from 200,000 to 400,000 eggs.  The Barracuda, like most other fish, exhibit external fertilization and lay their eggs in intervals.  The parents are not known to care for their young. They are pelagic spawners. In addition, the Pacific Barracuda are open water egg scatterers, meaning they do not guard their eggs and leave eggs after spawning in a water column in the open water.  Until this date, Pacific Barracuda are known to live to about 12 years. A documented distinction between males and females of this species is that females have a charcoal or black edge on their pelvic fins while the males will have a yellow or olive-colored edge on the corresponding fins.

Conservation
Pacific barracuda are considered a huge sporting fish in California. In the early 1900s, the purse seine fishery heavily targeted the Pacific Barracuda.   Their population continually decreased until the 1940s when the state of California put size and technique restrictions on the commercial and recreational fishing of the Pacific Barracuda.  These restrictions caused commercial fisheries to start using gill nets instead of purse seines. Furthermore, Barracuda are not a common seafood item. Since these restrictions were put, the population size has increased to near record levels.  Nowadays, although fishing the species is still popular, the population size is overall stable. The stability of their population size is also somewhat attributed to their substantial egg production. They are not on the IUCN Red List of threatened or vulnerable species. The restrictions continue to protect the species. However, due to their migration, some of their range of population may be threatened. Predators of the Pacific Barracuda include eagles and terns. 
The Pacific Barracuda is not typically favored as a food fish in the US due to its association with its Atlantic and Caribbean relative, the Great Barracuda, which is strongly linked to ciguatera poisoning. However, the Pacific Barracuda is considered safe to eat. Quick bleeding is recommended to preserve the freshness of the meat to prevent spoiling.  
Even though the cases have been rare and are not substantial, there are ways the Pacific Barracuda can cause ciguatera poisoning. This is when the fish feed on reef fish that have fed on algae or smaller fish that in turn have fed on toxin containing micro-alga.

References

Fish described in 1854